Jack Tempchin is an American musician and singer-songwriter who wrote the Eagles song "Peaceful Easy Feeling" and co-wrote "Already Gone", "The Girl From Yesterday", "Somebody", and "It's Your World Now".

Career
During the Eagles' breakup period (1980–1994) he co-wrote with Glenn Frey producing "You Belong to the City", "Smuggler's Blues", "The One You Love", "I Found Somebody", "Sexy Girl", and "True Love".

Tempchin wrote "Slow Dancing". The song was first recorded in 1976 by the short-lived group Funky Kings, of which Tempchin and Jules Shear were members at the time. In 1977, the song became a top-10 pop hit for Johnny Rivers titled as "Swayin' to the Music (Slow Dancing)", and in 1979 it was a top-10 country hit for Johnny Duncan.

Tempchin has also toured extensively as a solo artist over the years, opening for  Ringo Starr, Jackson Browne, Dave Mason, Poco, Dolly Parton, Karla Bonoff, Chicago, Christopher Cross, Kenny Loggins, Timothy B. Schmit, Barry McGuire, Tom Rush, Al Kooper and Emmylou Harris.

Tempchin was voted into the Songwriters Hall of Fame in 2019.

Other compositions include:
 "Someone That You Used to Know" (George Jones)
 "White Shoes" (Emmylou Harris, Randy Meisner)
 "Rollin'" (Glen Campbell)
 "To Feel That Way at All" (Patty Loveless)
 "Somebody Trying to Tell You Something" (Tanya Tucker)
 "You Can Go Home" (with Chris Hillman, recorded by The Desert Rose Band in 1991)
 "Your Tattoo" (Sammy Kershaw)
 "East of Eden" (Tom Rush)
 "15 Days Under the Hood" (Jack Tempchin, The Paladins, New Riders of the Purple Sage)
 "Who's Been Sleeping in My Bed" (Phantom Blues Band, Candye Kane)
 "Swayin' to the Music (Slow Dancing)" (Funky Kings (as "Slow Dancing", Johnny Rivers, Olivia Newton-John, Ian Gomm and Johnny Duncan)

Discography

with The Funky Kings
 1976 The Funky Kings

Solo albums
 1978 Jack Tempchin
 1994 After the Rain
 1995 Lonely Midnight
 1997 Best of Jack Tempchin (includes newly recorded versions of "Already Gone" and "Peaceful Easy Feeling" )
 2000 Live on Hwy 101
 2004 Staying Home
 2007 Songs
 2012 Live at Tales From The Tavern
 2015 Learning To Dance
 2016 One More Song
2017 Peaceful Easy Feeling – The Songs Of Jack Tempchin

References

Further reading 
  A review of Tempchin's 1978 self-titled album.

External links
Official Website
Official MySpace
Songs composed by Jack Tempchin
Jack Tempchin Interview NAMM Oral History Library (2010)

American rock songwriters
Living people
Year of birth missing (living people)
Place of birth missing (living people)
People from Encinitas, California
Songwriters from California